Hardwick is both a village and a civil parish within the Aylesbury Vale district in Buckinghamshire, England.  It is in the Aylesbury Vale, about four miles north of Aylesbury.

Hardwick is a common place name in England, of Old English origin meaning 'livestock farm'.  In the Domesday Book of 1086 the village was known as Harduich.

Nearby Weedon is a hamlet in the parish of Hardwick.

The parish church is dedicated to St Mary the Virgin, and the churchyard contains a grave for the soldiers who died during the English Civil War at the Battle of Aylesbury in 1642.

References

External links

Villages in Buckinghamshire
Civil parishes in Buckinghamshire